Explorer Peak is a  mountain summit located in Duchesne County, Utah, United States.

Description
Explorer Peak is set within the High Uintas Wilderness on land managed by Ashley National Forest. It is situated in the Uinta Mountains which are a subset of the Rocky Mountains, and it ranks as the 38th-highest summit in Utah. Neighbors include Dead Horse Peak three miles to the northwest and Mount Lovenia three miles northeast. Precipitation runoff from this mountain drains west to Fall Creek and east into tributaries of the Lake Fork River. The landform's toponym was officially adopted in 1957 by the U.S. Board on Geographic Names to honor the Explorer Scouts.

Climate
Based on the Köppen climate classification, Explorer Peak is located in a subarctic climate zone with cold snowy winters and mild summers. Tundra climate characterizes the summit and highest slopes.

See also
 Geology of the Uinta Mountains
 List of mountains in Utah

References

External links
 Explorer Peak: weather forecast

Mountains of Utah
Features of the Uinta Mountains
Mountains of Duchesne County, Utah
North American 3000 m summits
Ashley National Forest